Bourtange (Gronings: Boertang) is a village with a population of 430 in the municipality of Westerwolde in the Netherlands. It is situated in the region Westerwolde in the east of the province of Groningen near the German border. Fort Bourtange was built in 1593 during the Dutch Revolt and was used until 1851. Between 1967 and 1992 the star fort was gradually restored to its mid-18th-century state and it is currently an open-air museum.

Etymology 
The name Bourtange comes from the Dutch word tange (sand ridge), because the settlement is situated on a strategically important sand ridge in the marshes of the Bourtange Moor.

History

Fort Bourtange was initially built during the Eighty Years' War (circa 1568–1648) when William I of Orange wanted to control the main road between Germany and the city of Groningen which was controlled by the Spanish. This road followed a sandy ridge (tange) through the marshes (the Bourtange Swamp).

Later, around 1594, Bourtange became part of the fortifications on the border between the northern provinces (Groningen, Friesland, Drenthe) and Germany.

Bourtange was a separate municipality until 1822, when it was merged with Vlagtwedde.

In 1851 the star fort was given up and Bourtange became a normal village.

Around 1960 living conditions in the village deteriorated and it was decided that Bourtange would be rebuilt to its state of 1740-1750. Today it is an open-air museum.

Geography 
Bourtange is located in the center of the municipality of Westerwolde and in the east of the province of Groningen near the German border. It is situated on a sand ridge in the Bourtange Moor, in the region of Westerwolde.

Demographics 
In 2001, the town of Bourtange had 267 inhabitants. The built-up area of the town was 0.21 km², and contained 133 residences. In 2005, the statistical area "Bourtange", which also can include the surrounding countryside, had a population of around 530.

References

External links
 
 

Former municipalities of Groningen (province)
Populated places in Groningen (province)
Westerwolde (municipality)
Marsh castles